Amaka Agugua-Hamilton (born April 13, 1983) is the current head coach of the Virginia Cavaliers women's basketball team.

Hofstra statistics 

Source

Missouri State 
Amaka Agugua-Hamilton was introduced as the head coach of the Missouri State Lady Bears basketball program on April 17, 2019. Agugua-Hamilton replaced Kellie Harper who left to become the head coach of her alma mater, the Tennessee Lady Vols. Agugua-Hamilton became the first African- American female head coach for any sport at Missouri State.

Inaugural Season 
During her inaugural season with the Lady Bears Agugua-Hamilton lead the team to a 26–4 record including a 16–2 mark in the Missouri Valley Conference. The Lady Bears finished the 2019–2020 season ranked 19th in the USA Today Coaches Poll and 23rd by the AP and 8th in the RPI.

The 26 wins by Agugua-Hamilton set the Missouri Valley Conference record for wins by a first year women's basketball coach. Agugua-Hamilton is also the first coach to win an outright MVC title during her rookie campaign. At the conclusion of the 2020 season Agugua-Hamilton was named the Missouri Valley Conference Coach of the Year. The Women's Basketball Coaches Association also named Agugua-Hamilton the Spalding Maggie Dixon Rookie Coach of the Year.

Virginia
Amaka Agugua-Hamilton was introduced as the head coach of the Virginia Cavaliers women's basketball program on March 21, 2022.

Personal life 
Agugua-Hamilton is a native of Herndon, Virginia and is a 2005 graduate of Hofstra University. She married Billy Hamilton in 2017 and together have a son Eze, born in April 2018. She is a Christian.

Head coaching record

References

External links
Missouri State Lady Bears Coaching bio

1983 births
Living people
American women's basketball coaches
American women's basketball players
Basketball coaches from Virginia
Basketball players from Virginia
Forwards (basketball)
Hofstra Pride women's basketball players
Indiana Hoosiers women's basketball coaches
Michigan State Spartans women's basketball coaches
Missouri State Lady Bears basketball coaches
Old Dominion Monarchs women's basketball coaches
People from Herndon, Virginia
Sportspeople from Fairfax County, Virginia
VCU Rams women's basketball coaches
Virginia Commonwealth University alumni